Shirley Frances Barker (April 4, 1911 – November 18, 1965) was an American writer, poet, and librarian.

Biography
Barker was born in Farmington, New Hampshire.  She attended the University of New Hampshire, graduating with a B.A. in 1934 as a member of Phi Beta Kappa.  While still an undergraduate, she won the Yale Series of Younger Poets Competition with her poetry collection The Dark Hills Under (1933).  It was published with a foreword by Stephen Vincent Benét and was well reviewed.

One of the judges had detected some literary affinities between her work and that of Robert Frost, so UNH President Edward M. Lewis asked Barker to send a copy of the collection to Frost, Lewis' friend and correspondent.  Frost was enraged by what he perceived as anti-Puritan and anti-theistic sentiments in Barker's poetry and bizarrely insisted that Barker was the illegitimate descendant of a person described in her poem "Portrait".  In what his biographer described as "a characteristic act of poetic retaliation", Frost penned the ribald poem "Pride of Ancestry" and the religious poem "Not All There".  He did not tell Lewis of his objections to Barker's work and there is no record that there was any correspondence between Frost and Barker.

Barker did not publish another book for sixteen years. She graduated with an A.M. in English from Radcliffe College in 1938 and a degree in library science from the Pratt Institute School of Information and Library Science in 1941.  Beginning in 1940, she worked as a librarian at the New York Public Library, primarily in the American history section.

In 1949, she published her debut novel, Peace My Daughters, about the Salem witch trials, which she believed her ancestors had attended.  She wrote a series of successful formula historical novels, most of them set in her native New England and some with supernatural elements.  Two of her novels, Rivers Parting (1952) and Swear by Apollo (1959), were Literary Guild selections. The success of these novels enabled her to leave the New York Public Library in 1953 and she moved to Concord, New Hampshire.

Barker was found inside a car in her garage in Penacook, New Hampshire, dead of carbon monoxide poisoning.  The car windows were up and the gas tank was empty.  Her death was ruled a suicide.  When Frost biographer Lawrance Thompson attempted to access her papers, he was told by her executor that they all "had disappeared under mysterious circumstances".  However, typescripts, galleys, and plate proofs of the novels Liza Bowe, Swear by Apollo, and The Last Gentleman are in the University of New Hampshire Library.

Selected works

 The Dark Hills Under (poems), Yale University Press (New Haven, CT), 1933.
 Peace, My Daughters, Crown (New York, NY), 1949.
 Rivers Parting, Crown, 1950.
 A Land and a People (poems), Crown, 1952.
 Fire and Hammer, Crown, 1953.
 Tomorrow the New Moon, Bobbs (New York, NY), 1955.
 Liza Bowe, Random (New York, NY), 1956.
 Swear by Apollo, Random, 1958.
 The Trojan Horse, Random, 1959.
 The Last Gentleman, Random, 1960.
 Corner of the Moon, Crown, 1961.
 The Road to Bunker Hill, Duell, Sloan & Pearce (New York, NY), 1962.
 Strange Wives, Crown, 1963.

References

External links
 
 

1911 births
1965 deaths
1965 suicides
20th-century American poets
20th-century American novelists
American women poets
American women novelists
American librarians
American women librarians
New York Public Library people
People from Concord, New Hampshire
Pratt Institute alumni
Radcliffe College alumni
Suicides by carbon monoxide poisoning
Suicides in New Hampshire
University of New Hampshire alumni
Novelists from New Hampshire
Yale Younger Poets winners
20th-century American women writers
People from Farmington, New Hampshire